Hapoel Ramat Gan Givatayim F.C. (Moadon Kaduregel Hapoel Ramat Gan Givatayim) is an Israeli football club from Ramat Gan and Givatayim. They currently play in Liga Leumit, the second tier of Israeli football. Home matches are played at Ramat Gan Stadium, which has a capacity of 13,370. Their regular home strip is all-red.

History
The club was founded in 1927 during the Mandate era by Jewish settlers in Ramat Gan. After independence, the club were placed in the top division.

After a series of mid-table finishes, they were relegated to the second division in 1959–60 after finishing bottom. In 1962–63, the club were promoted back to the top division, and followed it up by becoming the first team to win the championship in their first season after promotion. The championship-winning match against Hapoel Petah Tikva was watched by the club's record crowd of 9,000. However, this success proved to be their zenith, as they were overtaken by city rivals Hakoah who were champions in the following season, and were relegated at the end of the 1968–69 season.

The early 1980s was a yo-yo era, as the club were promoted and immediately relegated twice in succession from 1979–80 to 1982–83. In 1988–89 they won promotion again, but were again immediately relegated, this being their last period of time in the top flight.

By the end of the 1990s, the club had sunk into Liga Artzit, the third division, though they did pick up some silverware by winning the Toto Cup for third division teams in 1999–2000. In the same season, they were promoted back to the second division.

In 2002–03, Hapoel Ramat Gan became the first team from outside the top division to win the State Cup, when they beat Hapoel Be'er Sheva 5–4 on penalties after a 1–1 draw. The win also meant the club qualified for the UEFA Cup.

Hapoel were drawn against Levski Sofia of Bulgaria in the first round. However, because of a UEFA ban on matches in Israel at the time (due to the security situation), the club had to play their home match in Dunajská Streda, Slovakia. The "home" match attracted a crowd of just 300, and Hapoel lost the tie 5–0 on aggregate (1–0, 4–0).

The following season, the costs of playing in Europe and the loss of many of the best players saw the club finish bottom of the table, resulting in relegation back to the third level. A 9-point deduction for financial issues at the start of the 2005–06 season resulted in another season of struggle, with the club finishing one place above relegation. The following season they won the league, and were promoted back to Liga Leumit.

In 2008–09, the club was promoted to the Israeli Premier League.

At the end of the regular games of 2009/2010 season the team was ranked in 11th place, but after turning half points system offset various management problems is down to 14th place, promising only the remaining league playoff game against Hapoel Kfar Saba 0–1 after it increased . Summer 2010 was characterized by economic uncertainty following professional financial obligations. On June 30, the owner Yaron Koris announced that the team will continue to play after the coverage obligations by its sponsors, and that he leaves the group after four years. Group management was transferred to the management group headed by Shahar Ben Ami gave Datner. In addition, Yuval Naim left after five years as coach and was replaced by Shlomi Dora. On 15 November 2010, Dora was sacked as due to teams league ranking in the last place in the Israeli Premier League for a long time. He was replaced by Zvika Zemach. and now managed by Freddy David, who led the team to win the Toto Cup Leumit trophy in 2011.

Hapoel Ramat Gan finished the regular 2010–11 season at the bottom of the Israeli Premier Division, with just eight points – seventeen points adrift of the penultimately placed Bnei Sakhnin. They had already been deducted four points due to double contracts with players and staff from the previous year. They then finished at the foot of the Bottom Play-Offs mini-table and so were relegated into the Liga Leumit along with Hapoel Ashkelon.

In 2012–13, they were relegated from the Premier League and yet still won their second State Cup as they defeated Hapoel Ironi Kiryat Shmona 4–2 on penalties after a 1–1 draw.

Current squad
 As of 25 January 2023

European record

Honours

League

Cups

Records
 Attendance: 9,000 vs Hapoel Petah Tikva (28 March 1964)
 Win: 10–0 vs Beitar Netanya (18 May 1940)
 Goalscorer: Reuven Cohen, 85 goals (1955–68)

Managers

 Moshe Poliakov (1935)
 Haim Reich (1939)
 Isidor Singer (1939–45)
 Haim Reich (1946)
 Shlomo Poliakov (1947–50)
 Emmanuel Galili (1951)
 Zvi Erlich (1951–53)
 Emmanuel Galili (1953)
 Jack Schtakovnik (1953–54)
 Emmanuel Galili (1954–55)
 Monia Goshen (1955)
 Haim Reich (1955–56)
 Moshe Varon (1956–59)
 Herzl Fritzner (1959–61)
 Moshe Varon (1961–62)
 David Schweitzer (1962–65)
 Moshe Litvak (1965–66)
 David Schweitzer (1966–68)
 Yechiel Mor (1968–69)
 Reuven Cohen (1969–70)
 Avraham Bendori (1970–71)
 David Farkash (1971–72)
 Amnon Raz (1972–73)
 Nissim Bachar (1973–75)
 Benny Conforti (1975)
 Uri Weinberg (1975–76)
 Shimon Ben Yehonatan (1976–77)
 Hanoch Mordechovich (1977–78)
 Shmuel Baruch (1978–79)
 Leon Konstantinovski (1979–81)
 Eliezer Spiegel (1981–82)
 Shimon Ben Yehonatan (1982–83)
 Nissim Bachar (1983–84)
 Itzhak Vissoker (1984–85)
 Amir Kopler (1985–86)
 Shimon Ben Yehonatan (1986)
 Ronny Levy (1986)
 Michael Kadosh (1986–87)
 Moshe Meiri (1987–88)
 Leon Konstantinovski (1988–89)
 Dror Kashtan (1989–90)
 David Schweitzer (1990–91)
 Moshe Meiri (1991–92)
 Dror Bar Nur (1992–93)
 Aharon Kapitolnik (1993)
 Avi Buchsenbaum (1993–95)
 Reuven Cohen (1995–96)
 Asher Messing (1996–97)
 David Karako (1997–98)
 Janos Pas and  Ilan Harpaz (1998)
 Eli Cohen (1998–2001)
 Motti Ivanir (2001–02)
 Eli Cohen (2002–04)
 Yaron Hochenboim (2004)
 Itzik Baruch (2004)
 Itzik Ovadia (2004–05)
 Rafi Buskila (2005)
 Nissim Cohen (2005)
 Yuval Naim (2005–10)
 Shlomi Dora (2010)
 Tzvika Tzemah (2010–11)
 Itzik Baruch (2011)
 Yaron Hochenboim (2011)
 Freddy David (2011–12)
 Eli Cohen (2012–13)
 Arik Gilrovich (2013)
 Guy Levy (2013–14)
 Tamir Ben Ami (2014)
 Dani Golan (2014–16) 
 Patricio Sayegh (2016)
 Lior Zada (2016–17)
 Arik Benado (2017)
 Itzik Baruch (2017-2018)
 Dani Golan (2018)
 Nir Berkovic (2018–2019)

Source:

References

External links
Official Site
Fansite 

Ramat Gan Givatayim
Ramat Gan Givatayim
Sport in Ramat Gan
Sport in Givatayim
Association football clubs established in 1927
1927 establishments in Mandatory Palestine